Events in the year 2010 in Gabon.

Incumbents 

 President: Ali Bongo Ondimba
 Prime Minister: Paul Biyoghé Mba

Events 

 10 February – The National Union was formed.

Deaths

References 

 
2010s in Gabon
Years of the 21st century in Gabon
Gabon